Mohsenabad (also Romanized as Moḩsenābād) is a village in Jowshan Rural District, Golbaf District, Kerman County, Kerman Province, Iran. At the 2006 census, its population was 111, in 21 families.

References 

Populated places in Kerman County